Dennis McGrath (7 September 1946 – 19 August 2004) was an  Australian rules footballer who played with North Melbourne in the Victorian Football League (VFL).

Notes

External links 

1946 births
2004 deaths
Australian rules footballers from Victoria (Australia)
North Melbourne Football Club players